Zalipais inscripta is a species of minute sea snail, a marine gastropod mollusc in the family Skeneidae.

Description
The height of the shell attains 1.2 mm, its diameter 2.2 mm. The minute, very fragile shell has a discoidal shape. It is diaphanous and widely umbilicated. The spire is flat, not rising above the plane of the last whorl. The four whorls are convex, with a gentle antesutural slope. The surface of the shell is smooth and shining, but incremental striae are visible under magnification. The aperture is roundly oval, a little wider than high. The peristome of the holotype is incomplete.

Distribution
This marine species is endemic to Australia and occurs off New South Wales, South Australia, Tasmania, Victoria.

References

 Kershaw, R.C. 1955. A systematic list of the Mollusca of Tasmania, Australia. Papers and Proceedings of the Royal Society of Tasmania 89: 289-355
 Cotton, B.C. 1959. South Australian Mollusca. Archaeogastropoda. Handbook of the Flora and Fauna of South Australia. Adelaide : South Australian Government Printer 449 pp.
 Iredale, T. & McMichael, D.F. 1962. A reference list of the marine Mollusca of New South Wales. Memoirs of the Australian Museum 11: 1-109

inscripta
Gastropods of Australia
Gastropods described in 1899